The Messerschmitt Bf 110, often known unofficially as the Me 110, is a twin-engine  (Destroyer, heavy fighter), fighter-bomber (Jagdbomber or Jabo), and night fighter (Nachtjäger) developed in Nazi Germany in the 1930s and used by the Luftwaffe during World War II. Hermann Göring was a proponent of the Bf 110, believing its heavy armament, speed, and range would make the Bf 110 the Luftwaffe’s premier offensive fighter. Early variants were armed with two MG FF 20 mm cannon, four 7.92 mm (.312 in) MG 17 machine guns, and one 7.92 mm (.312 in) MG 15 machine gun for defence (later variants would replace the MG FFs with MG 151s and the rear gunner station would be armed with the twin-barreled MG 81Z). Development work on an improved type to replace the Bf 110 - the Messerschmitt Me 210 - began before the war started, but its teething troubles resulted in the Bf 110 soldiering on until the end of the war in various roles. Its intended replacements, the aforementioned Me 210 and the significantly improved Me 410 Hornisse, never fully replaced the Bf 110.

The Bf 110 served with considerable success in the early campaigns in Poland, Norway and France. The primary weakness of the Bf 110 was its lack of maneuverability, although this could be mitigated with better tactics. This weakness was exploited by the RAF when Bf 110s were flown as close escort to German bombers during the Battle of Britain. When British bombers began targeting German territory with nightly raids, some Bf 110-equipped units were converted to night fighters, a role to which the aircraft was well suited. After the Battle of Britain the Bf 110 enjoyed a successful period as an air superiority fighter and strike aircraft in other theatres and defended Germany from strategic air attack by day against the USAAF's 8th Air Force, until an American change in fighter tactics rendered them increasingly vulnerable to developing American air supremacy over the Reich as 1944 began.

During the Balkans and North African campaigns and on the Eastern Front, it rendered valuable ground support to the German Army as a potent fighter-bomber.
Later in the war, it was developed into a formidable radar-equipped night fighter, becoming the main night-fighting aircraft of the Luftwaffe. Most of the German night fighter aces flew the Bf 110 at some point during their combat careers and the top night fighter ace, Major Heinz-Wolfgang Schnaufer, flew it exclusively and claimed 121 victories in 164 sorties.

Design and development

Genesis and competition

Throughout the 1930s, the air forces of the major military powers were engaged in a transition from biplane to monoplane designs. Most concentrated on the single-engine fighter aircraft, but the problem of range arose. The Ministry of Aviation (RLM, for Reichsluftfahrtministerium), pushed by Hermann Göring, issued a request for a new multipurpose fighter called the Kampfzerstörer (battle destroyer) with long range and an internal bomb bay. The request called for a twin-engine, three-seat, all-metal monoplane that was armed with cannon as well as a bomb bay. Of the original seven companies, only Bayerische Flugzeugwerke (Messerschmitt), Focke-Wulf and Henschel responded to the request.

Messerschmitt defeated Focke-Wulf, Henschel, and Arado, and was given the funds to build several prototype aircraft. The Focke-Wulf design, the Focke-Wulf Fw 57, had a wing span of 25.6 m (84 ft) and was powered by two DB 600 engines. It was armed with two 20 mm MG FF cannons in the nose, while a third was positioned in a dorsal turret. The Fw 57 V1 flew in 1936 but its performance was poor and the machine crashed.
The Henschel Hs 124 was similar in construction layout to the Fw 57, equipped with two Jumo 210C for the V1. The V2 used the BMW 132Dc radial engines generating 870 PS compared with the 640 PS Jumo. The armament consisted of a single rearward-firing 7.92 mm (.312 in) MG 15 machine gun and a single forward-firing 20 mm MG FF cannon.

Messerschmitt omitted the internal bomb load requirement from the Ministry of Aviation directive to increase the armament element of the Ministry of Aviation's specification. The Bf 110 was far superior to its rivals in providing the speed, range and firepower to meet its role requirements. By the end of 1935, the Bf 110 had evolved into an all-metal, low-wing cantilever monoplane of semi-monocoque design featuring twin vertical stabilizers and powered by two DB 600A engines. The design was also fitted with Handley-Page wing slots(actually, leading-edge slats).

Early variants

By luck (and pressure by Ernst Udet), the Ministry of Aviation reconsidered the ideas of the Kampfzerstörer and began focusing on the Zerstörer. Due to these changes, the Bayerische Flugzeugwerke design better fitted the Ministry's requests. On 12 May 1936, Rudolf Opitz flew the first Bf 110 out of Augsburg. But, as many pre-war designs found, the engine technologies promised were not up to acceptable reliability standards. Even with the temperamental DB 600 engines, the Ministry of Aviation found that the Bf 110, while not as maneuverable as desired, was rather faster than its original request specified, as well as faster than the then-current front line fighter, the Bf 109 B-1. Thus the order for four pre-production A-0 units was placed. The first of these were delivered in January 1937. During this testing, both the Focke-Wulf Fw 187 and Henschel Hs 124 competitors were rejected and the Bf 110 was ordered into full production.

The initial deliveries of the Bf 110 encountered several delays with delivery of the DB 600 motors, which forced Bayerische Flugzeugwerke to install Junkers Jumo 210B engines, leaving the Bf 110 seriously underpowered and able to reach a top speed of only 431 km/h (268 mph). The armament of the A-0 units was also limited to four nose-mounted 7.92 mm (.312 in) MG 17 machine guns.

Even without delivery of the DB 600 engines, Bayerische Flugzeugwerke began assembly of the Bf 110 in mid-1937. As the DB 600 engines continued to have problems, Bayerische Flugzeugwerke was forced to keep on using Jumo motors, the 210G, which supplied 515 kW (700 PS) each (versus the 471 kW/640 PS supplied by the 210B). Three distinct versions of the Bf 110B were built: the B-1, which featured four 7.92 mm (.312 in) MG 17 machine guns and two 20 mm MG FF cannons; the B-2 reconnaissance version, which had a camera in place of the cannons; and the B-3 which was used as a trainer, with the cannons replaced by extra radio equipment. Only 45 Bf 110Bs were built before the Jumo 210G engine production line ended. The major identifier of the -A and -B-series Bf 110s was the very large "mouth" bath radiators located under each engine.

In late 1938, the DB 601 B-1 engines became available. With the new engine, the design teams removed the radiators under the engine nacelles and replaced them with water/glycol radiators for the C-series airframes onwards, placing them under the wing just outboard of each nacelle, otherwise similar in installation, appearance and function to those on the Bf 109E. With the DB 601 engine, the Bf 110's maximum speed increased to 541 km/h (336 mph) with a range of approximately 1,094 km (680 mi). A small oil cooler and air scoop remained under each engine nacelle for the remainder of the Bf 110's production run.

First conceived in the latter half of 1939, the D-series of Bf 110s was targeted to have improvements meant to increase its range. The initial D-series version, the Bf 110D-0 was designed to add a large, streamlined 1,050 litre (277 U.S. gallon) ventral fuel tank built under the fuselage, which required a substantially sized, conformal streamlined ventral fuselage fairing extending from halfway back under the nose to the rear of the cockpit glazing, inspiring the nickname Dackelbauch (dachshund's belly). The D-1 was also set up to accept a pair of fin-equipped 900 litre (238 U.S. gallon) drop tanks, one under each wing, increasing the total fuel capacity to 4,120 litres (1,088 U.S. gallons). The substantial added drag of the early "dachshund's belly" ventral fuselage tank in test flights mandated its omission from production D-1s although they were still prepared to mount an improved, better streamlined, version. D-1s so equipped were known as D-1/R1 whereas the D-1/R2 was equipped with two 900 L drop tanks and a droppable 85 L oil tank. Later D-2 and D-3 versions retained the twin underwing 900 litre drop tank capability, using multipurpose ordnance racks capable of holding either drop tanks or carrying bombs.

Later production variants

The production of the Bf 110 was put on a low priority in 1941 in expectation of its replacement by the Me 210. During this time, two versions of the Bf 110 were developed, the E and F models. The E was designed as a fighter bomber (Zerstörer Jabo), able to carry four 50 kg (110 lb) ETC 50 racks under the wing, along with the centreline ETC 500 bomb rack. The first E, the Bf 110 E-1 was originally powered by the DB 601B engine, but shifted to the DB 601P as they became available in quantity. A total of 856 Bf 110E models were built between August 1940 and January 1942.
The E models also had upgraded armour and some fuselage upgrades to support the added weight. Most pilots of the Bf 110E considered the aircraft slow and unresponsive, one former Bf 110 pilot commenting the E was "rigged and a total dog."

The Bf 110F featured the new DB 601F engines which produced 993 kW/1,350 PS (almost double the power the original Jumo engines provided), which allowed for upgraded armour, strengthening, and increased weight with no loss in performance. Three common versions of the F model existed. Pilots typically felt the Bf 110F to be the best of the 110 line, being fully aerobatic and in some respects smoother to fly than the Bf 109, though not as fast. Eventually 512 Bf 110F models were completed between December 1941 and December 1942, when production gave way to the Bf 110G.

Bf 110G production details

Although the Me 210 entered service in mid-1941, it was plagued with problems and was withdrawn from service for further development. In the wake of the failure of the Me 210, the Bf 110G was designed. The G model was fitted with DB 605B engines, producing 1,085 kW (1,475 PS) at their Notleistung (war emergency) top-level setting, and 997 kW (1,355 PS) at 5.8 km (19,000 ft) altitude. The Bf 110G also had upgraded nose armament, and underwent some changes which improved the aerodynamics of the aircraft. The rear cockpit access was moved forward from the transversely-hinged, "tilt-open" rearmost canopy glazing to a side/top hinged opening section of the main canopy, opening to port, with a new rearmost framed glazing section fixed in place. No Bf 110 G-1 existed, so the Bf 110 G-2 became the baseline Bf 110G. A large number of Rüstsätze field conversion packs were available, making the G subtype the most versatile production version of the Bf 110.
The initial batch of six pre-series production G-0 aircraft built in June 1942 were followed by 797 G-2, 172 G-3 and 2,293 of the night fighter-dedicated, three-seater G-4 models; built between December 1942 and April 1945. Pilots reported the Bf 110G to be a "mixed bag" in the air, in part due to all changes between the G and F series. The Bf 110G was considered a superior gun platform with excellent all-around visibility, and considered, until the advent of the Heinkel He 219, to be one of the Luftwaffe's best night fighters.

Armament
The Bf 110's main strength was its ability to mount unusually powerful air-to-air weaponry. Early versions had four 7.92 mm (.312 in) MG 17 machine guns in the upper nose and two 20 mm MG FF/M cannons fitted in the lower part of the nose. Later versions replaced the MG FF/M with the more powerful 20 mm MG 151/20 cannons and many G-series aircraft, especially those which served in the bomber-destroyer role, had two 30 mm (1.18 in) MK 108 cannons fitted instead of the MG 17. The defensive armament initially consisted of a single, flexibly mounted 7.92 mm (.312 in) MG 15 machine gun. Late F-series and prototype G-series were upgraded to a 7.92 mm (.312 in) MG 81 machine gun with a higher rate of fire, and the G-series was equipped with the twin-barreled MG 81Z. Many G-series night fighters were retrofitted or factory-built with the Schräge Musik off-bore gun system, which fired upward at an oblique angle for shooting down bombers while passing underneath; it was frequently equipped with two 20 mm MG FF/M, but field installations of the 20 mm MG 151/20 or 30 mm (1.18 in) MK 108 cannons were also used. The Schräge Musik weapons were typically mounted immediately in front of the rear cockpit.

The Bf 110 G-2/R1 was also capable of employing armament such as the Bordkanone series 37 mm (1.46 in) BK 3,7 autofed cannon, mounted in a conformal ventral gun pod under the fuselage. A single hit from this weapon was usually enough to destroy any Allied bomber.

The initial Bf 110 C-1/B fighter-bomber could carry two 250 kg (551 lb), two 500 kg (1,102 lb), or two 1,000 kg (2,204 lb) bombs on two ETC 500 racks under the fuselage and, starting with the Bf 110 E-0, could be supplemented by four additional 50 kg (110 lb) bombs on ETC 50 racks under the wing.

Night fighter
After a period of use on bombing and reconnaissance, the type found its niche during the winter of 1940-41 as a night fighter in defensive operations. At first the three main crew members had no special equipment for night operations and relied on their eyes alone to find enemy aircraft in the dark. Ground-controlled interception began from mid 1941 and the 110 began to take its toll on RAF bombers and was soon an aircraft to be feared. Airborne radar was used experimentally during 1941, effective up to a maximum distance of 3.5 km/ 2.2 miles and capable of bringing the 110 to within 200m/655 ft of a target.

By July 1942, the Bf 110F-4 was the first version to be designed specifically as a night fighter. It was something of a stop gap measure, though armed with four 7.92mm/ 0.31 In machine guns and two 20 mm / 0.78 In cannon.

Operational service

Variants
Bf 110 V1
First flown 12 May 1936 using two Daimler-Benz DB 600 engines
Bf 110 V2
Completed on 24 October 1936 using two Daimler-Benz DB 600 engines. It was assigned directly to the Luftwaffe test centre at Rechlin. Test pilots were pleased with its speed but disappointed in its maneuverability
Bf 110 V3
Same airframe as the V1 and V2 but was intended as a weapons test aircraft and had nose changes for armament. Completed and test flown on 24 December 1936 and also assigned to Rechlin.
Bf 110 A
Prototypes with two Junkers Jumo 210 B engines.
Bf 110 A-0
The designation of the first four pre-production aircraft. Armament consisted of four fixed MG 17 7.92 mm machine guns in the nose and one moveable MG 15 7.92 mm machine gun in the rear cockpit canopy.

Bf 110 B
Small-scale production with two Jumo 210 engines.
Bf 110 B-0
First pre-production aircraft, similar to B-1.
Bf 110 B-1
Zerstörer, four 7.92 mm (.312 in) MG 17 machine guns and two 20 mm MG FF cannons, nose-mounted.
Bf 110 B-2
Reconnaissance, both MG FF cannons removed, and various camera models added.
Bf 110 B-3
Trainer. MG FF cannons removed, and extra radio gear added. Some war weary B-1 were later refitted as B-3s.

Bf 110 C

First major production series, DB 601 engines.
Bf 110 C-0
Ten pre-production aircraft.
Bf 110 C-1
Zerstörer, DB 601 B-1 engines.
Bf 110 C-2
Zerstörer, fitted with FuG 10 radio, upgraded from FuG III.
Bf 110 C-3
Zerstörer, upgraded 20 mm MG FFs to MG FF/M.
Bf 110 C-4
Zerstörer, upgraded crew armour.
Bf 110 C-4/B
Fighter-bomber based on C-4, fitted with a pair of ETC 500 bomb racks and upgraded DB 601 Ba engines.
Bf 110 C-5
Reconnaissance version based on C-4, both MG FF removed, and Rb 50/30 camera installed, uprated DB 601P engines.
Bf 110 C-6
Experimental Zerstörer, additional single 30 mm (1.18 in) MK 101 cannon in underfuselage mount, DB 601P engines.
Bf 110 C-7
Fighter-bomber based on C-4/B, two ETC 500 centreline bomb racks capable of carrying two 250, 500, or 1,000 kg (2,204 lb) bombs, uprated DB 601P engines.

Bf 110 D
Heavy fighter/fighter-bomber, extreme range versions based on C-series, prepared to operate with external fuel tanks. Often stationed in Norway.
Bf 110 D-0
Prototype using C-3 airframes modified with 1,050 L (277 US gal) belly-mounted tank called Dackelbauch ("dachshund's belly" in German).
Bf 110 D-1
Long-range Zerstörer, modified C series airframes with option to carry Dackelbauch belly tank and underwing drop tanks.
Bf 110 D-1/R1
Long-range Zerstörer, Dackelbauch ventral tank, option to carry additional wing mounted 900 L (240 US gal) drop tanks.
Bf 110 D-1/R2
Long-range Zerstörer, droppable 85 L oil tank under the fuselage instead of Dackelbauch ventral tank, two wing mounted 900 L (240 US gal) drop tanks.
Bf 110 D-2
Long-range Zerstörer, two wing-mounted 300 L (80 US gal) drop tanks and centreline mounted bomb racks for two 500 kg (1,100 lb) bombs.
Bf 110 D-3
Long-range Zerstörer, lengthened tail for rescue dinghy. Either two wing-mounted 300 L (80 US gal) or 900 L (240 US gal) drop tanks could be fitted. Optional fitting of ETC 500 bomb racks (impossible with 900 L drop tanks).
Bf 110 D-4
Long-range recon, both MG FF removed, and Rb 50/30 camera installed, two wing-mounted 300 L or 900 L drop tanks.

Bf 110 E

Mostly fighter bombers, strengthened airframe, up to 1,200 kg (2,650 lb) bombload.
Bf 110 E-0
Pre-production version, Daimler-Benz DB 601B engines, pair of ETC50 bomb racks fitted outboard of engines, armament as C-4.
Bf 110 E-1
Production version of E-0, DB 601P engines.
Bf 110 E-1/U1
Two-crew night fighter conversion, equipped with the Spanner-Anlage infrared homing device.
Bf 110 E-2
DB 601P engines, rear fuselage extension same as for D-3.
Bf 110 E-3
Long-range reconnaissance version, both MG FF removed, and Rb 50/30 camera installed.

Bf 110 F
Same as the E, again strengthened airframe, better armour, two 993 kW (1,350 PS) DB 601F engines.
Bf 110 F-1
Fighter-bomber.
Bf 110 F-2
Long-range Zerstörer, often used against Allied heavy bombers.
Bf 110 F-3
Long-range reconnaissance version.
Bf 110 F-4
The first real night fighter (specially designed for this usage, 3-crew).

Bf 110 G

Improved F-series, two 1,085 kW (1,475 PS) DB 605B engines, tail rudders increased in size.
Bf 110 G-1
Not built.
Bf 110 G-2
Fighter-bomber, fast bomber, destroyer, often used against Allied heavy bombers. (often equipped with rockets).
Bf 110 G-2/R1
Bf 110 G-2 armed with a BK 3,7 under the fuselage.
Bf 110 G-2/R4
Bf 110 G-2 armed with a BK 3,7 under the fuselage and two MK 108 in the nose
Bf 110 G-3
Long-range reconnaissance version.
Bf 110 G-4
Three-crew night fighter, FuG 202/220 Lichtenstein radar, optional Schräge Musik, usually mounted midway down the cockpit with the cannon muzzles barely protruding above the canopy glazing. Multiple combinations of engine boosts, Schräge Musik, radar arrangements and forward firing armament were available in the form of Rüstsätze and Umrüst-Bausätze kits.

Bf 110 H
The final version, similar to the G, was cancelled before any prototypes were ready after important documents were lost in an air raid on the Waggonbau Gotha factory, which was leading the H-development.

Operators

 Luftwaffe

 Royal Hungarian Air Force

 Regia Aeronautica Italian Royal Air Force operated three Bf 110 Cs

 Royal Romanian Air Force

 Soviet Air Force operated a few captured Bf 110s. Before the war, one was sold in 1940 for testing the Volkov-Yartsev VYa-23 23mm cannon.

 Air Force of the Independent State of Croatia

 The Royal Air Force's 1426 Flight operated one captured Bf 110.

Surviving aircraft

Two intact Bf 110s are known to exist:

Messerschmitt Bf 110 G Werk Nr. 730301

This aircraft is displayed as fully assembled at the Royal Air Force Museum's London site at Hendon, North London. A G-series night fighter, it was likely built in 1944. It served with Nachtjagdgeschwader 3, the unit responsible for the night air defence of Denmark and North Germany until Germany's surrender in May 1945.
It was one of five Bf 110s taken by the British for technical evaluation. In 1946, it was selected for preservation by the Air Historical Branch. It was eventually moved to the RAF Museum in 1978, where it has remained ever since.

Messerschmitt Bf 110 F2 Werk Nr.  5052
Displayed at the Deutsches Technikmuseum Berlin.

Additionally, the Technik Museum Speyer preserves the wings and other parts from a Bf 110 that were recovered from a lake in Sweden in 1995. During the war, the aircraft landed on the frozen lake after being damaged by Swedish anti-aircraft fire.

Messerschmitt Bf 110 G4 (unknown Werk Nr.)

This aircraft is made from a wide range of original spare parts found all over the world. It is currently owned and displayed by a private foundation in Denmark.

Specifications (Bf 110 C-1)

See also

Notes

References

Sources
 Bergström, Christer. Black Cross – Red Star, Air War over the Eastern Front. Volume 4. Stalingrad to Kuban. Vaktel Books, 2019. 
 
 
 
 
 
 
 
 
 

 
 
 Weal, John. Messerschmitt Bf 110 Zerstörer Aces World War Two. London: Osprey, 1999. .

Further reading
 Campbell, Jerry L. Messerschmitt BF 110 Zerstörer in Action. Carrollton, Texas: Squadron/Signal Publications, Inc., 1977. .
 Caldwell, Donald and Richard Muller. The Luftwaffe over Germany: Defence of the Reich. London: Greenhill Books, 2007. .
 Ciampaglia, Giuseppe. "Destroyers in Second World War". Rome: IBN editore, 1996. .
 Deighton, Len. Fighter: The True Story of the Battle of Britain. London: Pimlico, 1996. .
 de Zeng, H. L., D. G. Stanket and E. J. Creek. Bomber Units of the Luftwaffe 1933–1945: A Reference Source, Volume 2. London: Ian Allan Publishing, 2007. .
 Hooton, E.R.Luftwaffe at War; Blitzkrieg in the West: Volume 2. London: Chevron/Ian Allan, 2007. .
 Hooton, E.R. Luftwaffe at War; Gathering Storm 1933–39: Volume 1. London: Chevron/Ian Allan, 2007. .

 Ledwoch, Janusz. Messerschmitt Bf 110 (Aircraft Monograph 3). Gdańsk, Poland: AJ-Press, 1994. .
 Middlebrook, Martin. The Peenemunde Raid: The Night of 17–18 August 1943. Barnsley, UK: Pen & Sword Aviation, 2004. .
 Murray, Willamson. Strategy for Defeat: The Luftwaffe 1935–1945. Maxwell AFB, Alabama: Air Power Research Institute, 1983. .
 Price, Alfred. Messerschmitt Bf 110 Night Fighters (Aircraft in Profile No. 207). Windsor, Berkshire, UK: Profile Publications Ltd., 1971.
 Treadwell, Terry C. Messerschmitt Bf 110(Classic WWII Aviation). Bristol, Avon, UK: Cerberus Publishing Ltd., 2005.  .
 Van Ishoven, Armand. Messerschmitt Bf 110 at War. Shepperton, Surrey: Ian Allan Ltd., 1985. .

External links

 Manual: (1944) A.M. Pamphlet 114C - Instructions for Flying the Messerschmitt 110
 Luftwaffe Resource Group
 Lemairesoft 
 Aces of the Luftwaffe by Heinz-Wolfgang Schnaufer 
 World War 2 Aircraft Performance - Me 110

Bf 110
1930s German fighter aircraft
World War II fighter aircraft of Germany
Low-wing aircraft
Aircraft first flown in 1936
Twin piston-engined tractor aircraft
Twin-tail aircraft